The Special Libraries Association (SLA) is an international professional association for library and information professionals working in business, government, law, finance, non-profit, and academic organizations and institutions.

History
The Special Libraries Association was founded in 1909 in the United States by a group of librarians working in specialized settings, led by John Cotton Dana, who served as the first president of SLA from 1909 to 1911. In the years prior to SLA's founding Dana and other librarians saw an increasing demand for the types of materials that specialized libraries could provide, and recognized that as information professionals working in such settings responded to the demands of their jobs they were creating a new kind of librarianship. Also, many of them were working as professional librarians but largely without the professional support enjoyed by other librarians and professionals.  The group sought to address their common problems by banding together. Their goal, as stated in the first issue of Special Libraries, was to "unite in co-operation all small libraries throughout the country; financial, commercial, scientific, industrial; and special departments of state, college and general libraries; and, in fact, all libraries devoted to special purposes and serving a limited clientage."

The SLA is now an international organization with members in over 75 countries and is organized by 55 regional Chapters. Additionally, the SLA also has a number of Divisions devoted to specific topic areas. Many Divisions also include Sections for sub-specialties. The current Divisions include: Academic; Biomedical & Life Sciences; Business & Finance; Chemistry; Competitive Intelligence; Education; Engineering; Environment & Resource Management; Food, Agriculture & Nutrition; Government Information; Information Technology; Insurance & Employee Benefits; Knowledge Management; Legal; Leadership & Management; Military Libraries; Museums, Arts & Humanities; News; Petroleum & Energy Resources; Pharmaceutical & Health Technology; Physics-Astronomy-Mathematics; Science-Technology; Social Science; Solo Librarians; Taxonomy; and Transportation.

Naming controversy 
From the time of the founding of the SLA there has been some controversy surrounding the terminology used in the name Special Libraries Association.  At the time of SLAs founding there was an almost immediate backlash against the term special library or special librarian.  For some, the term was too specific in that it had been used on a limited basis to that time to define reference collections which were limited or narrow in some way. For others, the term was too broad, focusing on a general type of collection rather than the work that the special librarian does. John Cotton Dana himself acknowledged the inadequacy of the name in the years following SLA's founding but noted the term was chosen by default as no other term would be as accurate yet encompassing. This debate continues today among organization members and official name changes were considered in 1982, 2003, and 2009 but they were eventually voted down by the membership.

Membership
SLA membership is open to any person or organization.  Members pay annual dues to SLA and additional fees for any Chapter, Division, or Caucus memberships they wish to obtain.  
Members of SLA typically possess a master's degree in library or information science and may have an advanced degree in a related field such as law, medicine or engineering.  While special libraries include law libraries, news libraries, corporate libraries, museum libraries, medical libraries, and transportation libraries, many information professionals today do not actually work in a library setting. They actively apply their specialized skills to support the information needs of their organizations. SLA members fill many non-traditional librarian roles such as corporate competitive intelligence analyst, researcher, or information specialist.  Given the rapid adoption of information technologies for selecting, analyzing, managing, storing, and delivering information and knowledge, the average SLA member might be performing a range of services and employing a diverse mix of skills related to, but not exclusive of, library science.  In fact, it is likely a special librarian does not work in a library, but rather an information center or resource center.

Governing structure
The SLA is governed by a board of directors who are elected by the membership according to the parameters set out in the SLA's bylaws. The board of directors is responsible for the overall direction and management of the SLA and selects the organization's officers.  The board of directors is led by a president who is elected for a one-year term. An executive director selected by the board oversees the day-to-day management and functions of SLA. SLA Welcomed Amy Lestition Burke, CAE, as its executive director in May 2016. Burke had been serving SLA as vice president of success since 1 March, when SLA entered into an agreement with association management company MCI USA (formerly Coulter Companies) to manage its operations.

Each of the regional Chapters and topical Divisions of SLA also elects officers and conducts meetings in a similar fashion to SLA.  Members are entitled to vote in board elections for each Chapter or Division in which they pay dues.

Committees and councils 
Committees and Councils are established by the board of directors in order to coordinate its activities relating to achieving the goals and objectives of the association. 
 Annual Conference Advisory Council
 Awards and Honors Committee
 Joint Governance and Bylaws Committee
 Emergency Preparedness & Recovery Advisory Council
 Finance Committee
 Industry Partners Alliance
 Information Outlook Advisory Council
 Membership Advisory Council
 Nominating Committee	Online Content Advisory Council
 Professional Development Advisory Council
 Public Relations Advisory Council
 Students and New Professionals Advisory Council
 Student Groups
 Technology Advisory Council
 Transition CommitteeTransition Committee

Activities

SLA activities include conferences, professional education, networking, and advocacy. The SLA Annual Conference & INFO-EXPO, usually held in the summer, includes education programs, networking events, and information exhibits.  The SLA 2017 Annual Conference took place in Phoenix. The SLA 2018 Annual Conference was held 9–13 June 2018, in Baltimore, Maryland.  The SLA 2019 Annual Conference is scheduled to be held 13–18 June in Cleveland, Ohio.

Awards
The SLA presents several awards, some on an annual basis.

Fellowship in SLA is bestowed on active, mid-career SLA members in recognition of past, present and future service to the association and the profession. Fellows are called upon and expected to advise the association's board of directors, prepare necessary documentation, and alert the membership to issues and trends warranting action.  No more than five SLA members can be selected as a Fellow in any given year. Individuals receiving this honor are able to use the title Fellow of the Special Libraries Association. (Members who are currently serving on the SLA Board of Directors are ineligible for designation as Fellows.)

John Cotton Dana Award is the SLA's top honor and is awarded to an individual in recognition of a lifetime of achievement and exceptional service to the SLA. (This should not be confused with the John Cotton Dana Library Public Relations Award, awarded by the American Library Association.)

Presidential Citations are given to SLA members for important or notable contributions advancing the SLA's goal or objectives during the previous year.  The Presidential Citations are given at the pleasure of the SLA President.

Rose L. Vormelker Award is given to a mid-career SLA member who actively teaches or mentors students or working professionals.

SLA Hall of Fame is presented to an SLA member near the end of their professional career in recognition of service and contributions to the SLA and its goal and objectives.

James M. Matarazzo Rising Star Award is presented annually to up to five new SLA members who have been members for no more than five years and show exceptional promise of leadership and contribution to the association and profession.

Nominees must meet at least one of the following criteria:

 Performed outstanding work and professional activities on behalf of SLA
 Developed notable innovations on the job
 Actively participated in SLA units and association programs
 Promoted the visibility of SLA or the value of information professionals

Recipients receive complimentary registration for the SLA Annual Conference & INFO-EXPO in the year in which they receive the award.

SLA Committee/Council/Unit Recognition Programs and SAAAC Merit Awards are presented by the SLA Student and Academic Affairs Advisory Council (SAAAC) in recognition of the active development and participation of student members through their involvement in SLA Student Group activities. Through these awards the SAAAC recognizes and honors SLA Student Groups whose outstanding leadership, innovative programming, or creative use of electronic resources contribute to increased membership and expanded professional development. SAAAC awards are made based on documented quantitative and qualitative evidence pertaining to one or more of the following award criteria:
 Increased student group membership
 Expanded professional development opportunities (both formal and informal)
 Heightened profile of the SLA Student Group within their own school, on their own campus, or in the professional community
 Success in bringing educators and practicing special librarians together
 Increased or enhanced profile of special librarianship and/or SLA within the academic or broader community

Several other awards are given out at the Chapter and Division level as well at the SLA Annual Conference.

Publications
Special Libraries (1910-1996), a journal containing articles and columns on cataloging and indexing, book reviews, and information about the Special Library Association.

Information Outlook (1997-2020), formerly Special Libraries, a bimonthly online professional/trade magazine. Publication ceased with the March-April 2020 issue.

References

External links
Official website
Special Libraries archive at SJSU ScholarWorks
Information Outlook archive at SJSU ScholarWorks

Library-related professional associations
Organizations based in Alexandria, Virginia
Organizations established in 1909